Hildegardia cubensis is a species of flowering plant in the family Malvaceae (formerly Sterculiaceae). The species is endemic to Cuba, and is threatened by habitat loss. In Cuba it is commonly known as Guana.

Hildegardia cubensis was first described in Urban Symbollae Antillianae vol. IX using specimens collected by Ekman in the municipality of Calixto García, eastern Cuba.

Description 
Hildegardia cubensis is a large tree, perennial and deciduous, reaching heights up to .The bark has a green to yellow-green colour and is fibrous and glabrous. Blooming from February to April, having hermaphrodite and masculine flowers. Seeds in samaras.

Uses 
At the beginning of the 20th century large quantities of the precious wood were exported to Germany. The strong yellow bast was used to make sombreros and to bundle cigars. Due to its rareness, Hildegardia cubensis bast was substituted by raffia and similar palm leaves.

Gallery

References

Trees of Cuba
Sterculioideae
Endemic flora of Cuba
Vulnerable plants
Taxonomy articles created by Polbot